Elections to Burnley Borough Council in Lancashire, England were held on 6 May 2010.  One-third of the council was up for election plus a by-election in the Queensgate ward following the death of Liberal Democrat councillor Bill Bennett (last elected in 2008). The Liberal Democrat party retained overall control of the council.

As the Liberal Democrat group and council leader Gordon Birtwistle was elected as constituency MP, following the election he was replaced in both these roles by Charlie Briggs.
Also a police investigation was launched into voting irregularities in the Daneshouse with Stoneyholme ward.

After the election, the composition of the council was:
Liberal Democrat 24
Labour 14
Conservative 5
British National Party 2

Election result

Ward results

References

2010 Burnley election result Accessed 2010
Election Results Accessed 2014

2010 English local elections
May 2010 events in the United Kingdom
2010
2010s in Lancashire